Miller Spur may refer to:

Miller Spur (Graham Land)
Miller Spur (Marie Byrd Land)